Patrick Kuru is a Cook Island former professional rugby league footballer who played as a  forward in the 1990s, 2000s and 2010s. He played at representative level for the Cook Islands, and at club level for the Bay of Plenty Stags and the Altona Roosters.

Playing career
Kuru played for the Bay of Plenty Stags in the 1996 Lion Red Cup, scoring two tries in the semi-final defeat by Waikato.

As of 2010, Kuru plays for the Altona Roosters in the Victorian Rugby League competition. Kuru captained the squad to the 2010 title. He was chosen in an Australian Affiliated national side in 2005, representing Victoria.

Representative career
Kuru made his début for the Cook Islands at the 1997 World Nines tournament.

He was then picked in the 2000 Rugby League World Cup squad.

Kuru later represented the Cook Islands in test series against New Zealand Māori in 2003 and Fiji in 2004.

References

External links

Bay of Plenty rugby league team players
Cook Island rugby league players
Cook Islands national rugby league team players
Living people
Place of birth missing (living people)
Year of birth missing (living people)
Cook Island expatriate rugby league players
Expatriate rugby league players in Australia
Cook Island expatriates in Australia
Rugby league second-rows